The 1929 Navy Midshipmen football team represented the United States Naval Academy during the 1929 college football season. In their fourth season under head coach Bill Ingram, the Midshipmen compiled a  record, shut out four opponents, and outscored all opponents by a combined score of 233 to 59.

The annual Army–Navy Game was not played in 1929 due to disagreement over player eligibility standards.

Schedule

References

Navy
Navy Midshipmen football seasons
Navy Midshipmen football